This list of gastropods described in 2019 is a list of new taxa of snails and slugs of every kind that have been described (following the rules of the ICZN) during the year 2019. The list only includes taxa at the rank of genus or species.

Fossil gastropods

Marine gastropods

New species

Vetigastropoda
The following new vetigastropod species were described:

Neogastropoda
The following new neogastropod species were described:

Nudibranchia
The following new nudibranch species were described:
Janolus flavoanulatus Pola & Gosliner, 2019
Janolus incrustans Pola & Gosliner, 2019
Janolus tricellariodes Pola & Gosliner, 2019
Madrella amphora Pola & Gosliner, 2019
Okenia longiductis Pola, Paz-Sedano, Macali, Minchin, Marchini, Vitale, Licchelli & Crocetta, 2019
Okenia problematica Pola, Paz-Sedano, Macali, Minchin, Marchini, Vitale, Licchelli & Crocetta, 2019
Unidentia aliciae Korshunova, Mehrotra, Arnold, Lundin, Picton & Martynov, 2019

New genera
Cyclimetula S.-I Huang & M.-H. Lin, 2019
Warenia Houart, Vermeij & Wiedrick, 2019

Freshwater gastropods
 Bosnidilhia vitojaensis Grego, Glöer, Falniowski, Hofman & Osikowski, 2019
 Bythinella magdalenae Glöer & Hirschfelder, 2019
 Bythinella sitiensis Glöer & Hirschfelder, 2019
 Bythinella steffeki Grego & Glöer, 2019
 Fluminicola klamathensis Liu & Hershler, 2019
 Paladilhiopsis cattaroensis Grego, Glöer, Falniowski, Hofman & Osikowski, 2019
 Paladilhiopsis matejkoi Grego, Glöer, Falniowski, Hofman & Osikowski, 2019
 Plagigeyeria feheri Grego, Glöer, Falniowski, Hofman & Osikowski, 2019
 Pseudamnicola occulta Glöer & Hirschfelder, 2019
 Radix dgebuadzei Aksenova, Vinarski, Kondakov, Tomilova, Artamonova, Makhrov, Kononov, Gofarov, Fang & Bolotov, 2019
 Salaeniella valdaligaensis Boeters, Quiñonero-Salgado & Ruiz-Cobo, 2019
 Stygobium hercegnoviensis Grego, Glöer, Falniowski, Hofman & Osikowski, 2019
 Travunijana vruljakensis Grego & Glöer, 2019
 Valvata armeniaca Glöer & Walther, 2019
 Valvata kournasi Glöer & Hirschfelder, 2019

Land gastropods

New species
 Afrocyclus bhaca Cole, 2019
 Afrocyclus oxygala Cole, 2019
 Afrocyclus potteri Cole, 2019
 Aulacospira krobyloides Páll-Gergely & Schilthuizen, 2019
 Aulacospira lens Páll-Gergely & Auffenberg, 2019
 Bradybaena linjun Wu & Chen, 2019
 Chondrocyclus amathole Cole, 2019
 Chondrocyclus cooperae Cole, 2019
 Chondrocyclus devilliersi Cole, 2019
 Chondrocyclus herberti Cole, 2019
 Chondrocyclus kevincolei Cole, 2019
 Chondrocyclus langebergensis Cole, 2019
 Chondrocyclus pondoensis Cole, 2019
 Chondrocyclus pulcherrimus Cole, 2019
 Chondrocyclus silvicolus Cole, 2019
 Cyclophorus cucphuongensis Oheimb, 2019
 Cyclophorus paracucphuongensis Oheimb, 2019
 Cyclophorus phongnhakebangensis Oheimb, 2019
 Cyclophorus takumisaitoi Hirano, 2019
 Cyclophorus tamdaoensis Do & Do, 2019
 Cylindrophaedusa parvula Gittenberger & Leda, 2019
 Cylindrophaedusa tenzini Gittenberger & Sherub, 2019
 Drymaeus verecundus Breure & Mogollón, 2019
 Ennea nigeriensis de Winter & de Gier, 2019 
 Eostrobilops zijinshanicus Chen, 2019
 Formosana renzhigangi Grego & Szekeres, 2019
 Ganesella halabalah Sutcharit & Panha, 2019
 Georissa corrugata Khalik, Hendriks, Vermeulen & Schilthuizen, 2019
 Georissa insulae Khalik, Hendriks, Vermeulen & Schilthuizen, 2019
 Georissa trusmadi Khalik, Hendriks, Vermeulen & Schilthuizen, 2019
 Haploptychius bachmaensis Bui, Do, Ngo & Do, 2019
 Hemiplecta jensi Páll-Gergely, 2019
 Laocaia simovi Dedov & Schneppat, 2019
 Muangnua arborea Tumpeesuwan & Tumpeesuwan, 2019 
 Notharinia constricta Vermeuleun, Luu, Theary & Anker, 2019
 Notharinia lyostoma Vermeuleun, Luu, Theary & Anker, 2019
 Notharinia ongensis Vermeuleun, Luu, Theary & Anker, 2019
 Notharinia soluta Vermeuleun, Luu, Theary & Anker, 2019
 Notharinia stenobasis Vermeuleun, Luu, Theary & Anker, 2019
 Notharinia subduplex Vermeuleun, Luu, Theary & Anker, 2019
 Notharinia whitteni Vermeuleun, Luu, Theary & Anker, 2019
 Oospira haivanensis Bui & Szekeres, 2019
 Perrottetia namdongensis Bui, Do, Ngo & Do, 2019
 Phaedusa adrianae Gittenberger & Leda, 2019
 Phaedusa chimiae Gittenberger & Sherub, 2019
 Phaedusa sangayae Gittenberger & Leda, 2019
 Pseudopomatias barnai Gittenberger, Leda, Sherub & Gyeltshen, 2019
 Pseudostreptaxis harli Páll-Gergely & Schilthuizen, 2019
 Serriphaedusa (Gibbophaedusa) gerberi Grego & Szekeres, 2019
 Sinochloritis lii Wu & Chen, 2019
 Sinoxychilus melanoleucus Wu & Liu, 2019
 Zospeum gittenbergeri Jochum, Prieto & De Winter, 2019
 Zospeum praetermissum Jochum, Prieto & De Winter, 2019

New subspecies
 Albinaria latelamellaris kekovensis Örsten, 2019
 Alopia livida vargabandii Fehér et Szekeres, 2019
 Cyclophorus implicatus kanhoensis Do & Do, 2019

See also
 List of gastropods described in 2018
 List of gastropods described in 2020

References

Gastropods
Molluscs described in 2019